Jessica McClain ( Tonn born February 15, 1992) is an American middle-distance and long-distance runner. As a Stanford Cardinal, Jess was a seven-time NCAA Division 1 All-American cross country and Track and field runner.

High school
Jessica Tonn qualified 4 years for Foot Locker Cross Country Championships for Xavier College Preparatory (Arizona). Jessica won 14 individual state titles, two in cross country and 12 in Track and field in Arizona Interscholastic Association.

NCAA
Jessica Tonn graduated BA and MA from Stanford. Tonn won 2015 Pac-12 Conference 10,000 meters in 34:00. As a Stanford Cardinal, Jessica Tonn was a seven-time NCAA Division 1 All-America.

Professional
Jessica Tonn signed with Brooks in November 2015.

Jessica ran a 1500m in 4:20.89 at Payton Jordan Invitational in Stanford (USA) 01.05.2016. Jessica ran a 5000m in 15:30.34 at Hoka One One held at Occidental College in Los Angeles (USA) 20.05.2016. Jessica ran a 1500m in 4:16 in Seattle at Brooks PR meet June 18, 2016.

Jessica placed second in 15:38.46 for 5000 meters on April 14, 2017, at Mt SAC Relays.

Jessica won a 10,000m in 31:54.83 at Payton Jordan Invitational in Stanford (USA) 03.05.2018.

In January 2019, Tonn left Seattle and Beast Track Club to coach Arizona State Sun Devils student-athletes. In November 2019, she placed second at the 2019 Abbott Dash to the Finish Line 5K / USATF 5K Championships in New York, finishing in 15:44, a mere second behind winner Shannon Rowbury.

References

External links
 Stanford University Jessica Tonn profile
 Athletics Jessica Tonn profile
 Kimbia Jessica Tonn profile
 Jessica Tonn profile Twitter
 Jessica Tonn profile Instagram
 
 
 Jessica Tonn Prep results
 Stanford Jessica Tonn v NCAA lawsuit
 Jessica Tonn Stanford Daily news coverage
 Jessica Tonn facebook
 brooks beasts team
 
 Jessica Tonn & Connor Mcclain marriage November 13, 2021

1992 births
Living people
Sportspeople from the Phoenix metropolitan area
Sportspeople from Scottsdale, Arizona
People from Paradise Valley, Arizona
Track and field athletes from Arizona
American female middle-distance runners
American female long-distance runners
Stanford Cardinal women's cross country runners
Stanford Cardinal women's track and field athletes
21st-century American women